Mugh (formerly Muk) is a village in Tajikistan. It is part of the jamoat Lakhshi Bolo in Lakhsh District, one of the Districts of Republican Subordination.

References

Populated places in Districts of Republican Subordination